Danil Domdjoni (born 8 September 1985) is a Croatian karateka. A native of Biograd na Moru, he is a member of the local Karate klub B. He started competing in the senior category in 2006, and has won both European and World titles in the Male Kumite -60 kg category.

He also won the Zadar County Sportsman of the Year Award for 2007, 2008 and 2009.

Senior medals

References

External links
 Danil Domdjoni at the World Karate Federation
 

1985 births
Living people
Croatian male karateka
Karateka at the 2015 European Games
European Games competitors for Croatia
World Games medalists in karate
World Games bronze medalists
Competitors at the 2009 World Games
21st-century Croatian people